Palliyeri is a village in the Thanjavur taluk of Thanjavur district, Tamil Nadu, India.

Demographics 

As per the 2001 census, Palliyeri had a total population of 1039 with 514 males and 525 females. The sex ratio was 1021. The literacy rate was 74.32.

References 

 

Villages in Thanjavur district